Pir Kashan (also Romanized as Pīr Kāshān) is a village in Poshtdarband Rural District, in the Central District of Kermanshah County, Kermanshah Province, Iran. At the 2006 census, its population was 205, in 48 families.

References 

Populated places in Kermanshah County